Viktor Frantsevich Zhdanovich (born 27 January 1938, Leningrad) is a Soviet and Russian fencer.

He was World Champion four times (1959, 1960, 1961 and 1963) and twice Olympic Champion (1960) in the foil individual events, and in 1964 in the foil team gold medal.

References

External links
 Russian informative site

1938 births
Living people
Sportspeople from Saint Petersburg
Russian male fencers
Soviet male fencers
Honoured Masters of Sport of the USSR
Recipients of the Order of the Red Banner of Labour
Olympic fencers of the Soviet Union
Fencers at the 1956 Summer Olympics
Fencers at the 1960 Summer Olympics
Fencers at the 1964 Summer Olympics
Olympic gold medalists for the Soviet Union
Olympic medalists in fencing
Medalists at the 1960 Summer Olympics
Medalists at the 1964 Summer Olympics
Universiade medalists in fencing
Universiade silver medalists for the Soviet Union
Medalists at the 1959 Summer Universiade
Medalists at the 1961 Summer Universiade